Cape Bridgman is a headland in the Wandel Sea, Arctic Ocean, northeast Greenland.

The cape was named by Robert Peary after Herbert L. Bridgman, one of the members of the Peary Arctic Club in New York.

Geography
Cape Bridgman is located on the northern side of the mouth of Frederick E. Hyde Fjord , Peary Land. Cape John Flagler is the headland on the southern side of the fjord entrance. Administratively it is part of the Northeast Greenland National Park.

In 1900 this headland was Robert Peary's easternmost accurate geographic exploration in the north of Greenland, for further south he encountered fog. In 1907 it became an important landmark for the Denmark expedition which mapped for the first time the unknown area to the south and southeast of the cape, as well as part of the Daly Range, rising to the west above the plain.

References

External links
 Kap Bridgman, Greenland - Geographical Names

Bridgman
Peary Land